Jiyan (Life in Kurdish) is a 2001 film directed by the Kurdish director Jano Rosebiani.

Plot
Diyari, a Kurdish-American returns to his hometown of Halabja, to build an orphanage five years after the chemical bombing. There, he meets Jiyan and Sherko, orphan survivors of the attack. During his stay in the town, Diyari brings a short lived spark of hope and happiness to the children's lives, and as he leaves, the orphans go back to their lonely lives. Diyari leaves tearful Jiyan at the place where they met first: on a swing under a lonely tree on a small hill.

Awards
Special Jury Award, New Director's Showcase, Seattle International Film Festival, 2002.
Best Film Award, Man and his Environment, International Film Festival Festoria, Portugal, 2002.
Popular Jury Award, Rights to Have Rights Film Festival, Italy, 2003.

Cast
Kurdo Galali
Derya Qadir
Pirshang Berzinji
Choman Hawrami
Enwer Shexani
Rubar Ehmed
Niyaz Letif
Tara Ebdilrehman

References

External links

2002 drama films
Kurdish films
Films directed by Jano Rosebiani
Kurdish words and phrases